All Round to Mrs. Brown's is an Irish comedy talk show created by and starring Brendan O'Carroll with his family and other cast members from his original comedy show, Mrs. Brown's Boys and Aly Mahmoud as Chef Aly. After the final episode of the first series aired, the BBC announced a second series, which started airing in 2018. A fourth series had been confirmed and started airing on 21 March and the series concluded on 25 April 2020. On 20 June it was confirmed that due to the COVID-19 pandemic the show will not return in 2021. In 2022 the series was officially cancelled.

The first series was the final TV appearance of Rory Cowan as Rory Brown, since Cowan left the franchise shortly after. The second series starred Cowan's replacement, Damien McKiernan, who debuted in the role during the 2017 Christmas special of Mrs Brown's Boys.

Plot summary
Mrs. Brown opens the doors to her house for a Saturday night entertainment show in which she and the family are joined by celebrity guests.

Episodes

Series 1 (2017)

The DVD issue of the first series omits all six music numbers in Foley's and all associated sketches with the music artists, except for James Blunt. Also, When Agnes is with Chef Aly and says "Reggae" the music they dance to has been changed from Shaggy's "Boombastic" to "She's Got Me Dancing" by Tommy Sparks.

Series 2 (2018)
BBC announced a second series, which began airing on 19 May 2018. Recording of the second series took during late April and early May 2018, with the second series airing from 19 May - 23 June 2018 on BBC One.

Series 3 (2019)
The BBC recommissioned a third series for 2019 with filming taking place between 5 and 19 February.

Thought for the Day was removed from this series and was replaced with Father Damien's Audience Confessions

}}

Series 4 (2020)
The fourth series was filmed from 30 January - 11 February 2020, and has finished running the six episodes for this year.
 
D & B's celebrity tours, Mammy of the Week and the Wash & Blow Game Show were removed from this series and was replaced with more interaction with special guests.

Home release
The first series was released on DVD by Universal Pictures, on 16 October 2017. The pack also contains 14 minutes of additional content. The second series was released on 3 December 2018; the release included additional material such as extended outtakes and unseen clips. The third series was released on 2 December 2019, again with additional content. The release date for the fourth series which was released on 21 March 2020 - 25 April 2020.

See also
Mrs. Brown's Boys D'Movie
"Mammy Sutra"

References

External links
 

Mrs. Brown's Boys
2017 British television series debuts
2020 British television series endings
2010s British comedy television series
2020s British comedy television series
BBC television sitcoms
BBC television talk shows
BBC Scotland television shows
Television series by Hungry Bear Media
English-language television shows
Television spin-offs
2010s British television talk shows
2020s British television talk shows